Eswatini Airlink was a regional airline based in Matsapha, Eswatini, and was the flag carrier of that country.

History
Eswatini Airlink was formed as a joint venture company between the Swaziland Government (60%) and Airlink (40%) to take over operations from Royal Swazi National Airways Corporation (RSNAC), the previous flag carrier of Eswatini. Swaziland Airlink started operations in July 1999 with a leased Fokker F28 aircraft from RSNAC linking Matsapha Airport with Johannesburg and Dar-es-Salaam.

In June 2000, the Fokker F28 was replaced with a BAe Jetstream 41 aircraft. Swaziland Airlink became Eswatini Airlink after the country's name was changed.

The airline ceased operations on June 1, 2022.

Destinations
Eswatini Airlink served the following destinations as part of Airlink:

Fleet
Eswatini Airlink did not maintain a dedicated fleet at the time of closure. Flights were operated under Airlink's AOC as part of the Airlink schedule using  or  aircraft. Eswatini Airlink previously operated the BAe Jetstream 41, Fokker F28, and Embraer ERJ-135 under their own AOC.

References

External links
 Official website

Defunct airlines of Eswatini
Airlines established in 1999
Airlines disestablished in 2022
Airlines formerly banned in the European Union
1999 establishments in Swaziland